Anti-Catholic riots were a phenomenon, particularly in the English speaking world, which tended to accompany the lifting of legal sanctions against the Catholic minority in these countries.  Examples included:

 Philadelphia Anti-Catholic Riots
 Bath, Maine anti-Catholic riot of 1854
 Gordon Riots in London
 1969 Northern Ireland Riots

References